Calvin Jong-a-Pin (born 18 July 1986) is a Dutch former professional footballer who played as a defender.

Primarily considered a central defender, Jong-a-Pin has proved extremely versatile and has been deployed as a left back and a defensive midfielder at various spells in his career.

Club career

Early career
Jong-a-Pin was born in Amsterdam and started his professional career at FC Volendam. He made his debut for Volendam against N.E.C. He scored his first goal for Volendam the following match.

Heerenveen
In 2006 Jong-a-Pin signed a five-year deal with Heerenveen. He made his debut against FC Groningen being the youngest starting player at the age of 19 in the match. In his first season he was backup to Kristian Bak Nielsen as left-back. In the 2007–08 season, Jong-a-Pin became a regular due to the departure of Nielsen playing 23 matches in the Eredivisie. Due to his impressive performances in 2007, he was selected by Foppe de Haan in the 18-man squad to participate in the 2008 Summer Olympics for Netherlands, playing in three matches in the tournament. In 2009 Jong-a-Pin joined Vitesse Arnhem on loan. After a very impressive season with Vitesse playing 30 matches scoring one goal, Heerenveen were convinced he was going to return as a starter in the Heerenveen line-up. Jong-a-Pin returned and was played as starting left-back in the 2010–11 season and played 29 matches for Heerenveen.

Vitesse (loan)
In 2009 Jong-a-Pin joined Vitesse on a one-year loan. He made his debut for Vitesse against FC Utrecht. He scored his first goal for Vitesse against RKC Waalwijk and scored the only goal of the match. He was a starting player in the Vitesse line-up and played 30 matches scoring 1 goal.

Japan

On 17 August 2011, Jong-a-Pin moved to Japan, signing a contract with J1 League side Shimizu S-Pulse. Following Shinji Ono's departure in October 2012, he was appointed the new vice captain.

On 21 February 2016, Jong-a-Pin signed for J2 League side FC Machida Zelvia, arriving on a free transfer.
On 6 January 2017, Yokohama FC announced the new signing of Calvin Jong-a-pin . 
On 21 July, Calvin Jong-a-pin posted a video on his Instagram that Yokohama FC will not extend his contract and will be a free agent on 1 August and now till this day he's still without a club.

International career
In 2007 Jong-a-Pin was called up by Jong Oranje coach Foppe de Haan to be part of his squad for the 2007 UEFA European Under-21 Football Championship held in the Netherlands. Jong-a-Pin participated in both of their first round group matches against Israel (1–0 win) and Portugal (2–1 win) to secure a semi final spot and to qualify for the 2008 Summer Olympics. Later the final was reached with a 1–1, 13–12 win after a penalty shootout with 32 penalty kicks taken against England. The Dutch went on to retain their 2006 title by beating Serbia 4–1 in the final. Jong-a-Pin played 3 games in the 2008 Summer Olympics, which occurred in his ancestral country China.

Personal life
His family is from Suriname, with some Chinese ancestry from his father's side.

Career statistics
.

Honours
 KNVB Cup: 2009
 UEFA European Under-21 Championship: 2007

References

External links

 Profile at Yokohama FC
 Netherlands stats at OnsOranje
 Calvin Jong-a-Pin Interview

1986 births
Living people
Hakka sportspeople
Sportspeople of Chinese descent
Association football defenders
Dutch footballers
Footballers from Amsterdam
Dutch expatriate footballers
Dutch expatriate sportspeople in Japan
Dutch people of Chinese descent
Dutch sportspeople of Surinamese descent
Eerste Divisie players
Eredivisie players
Expatriate footballers in Japan
FC Volendam players
Footballers at the 2008 Summer Olympics
J1 League players
J2 League players
Netherlands under-21 international footballers
Olympic footballers of the Netherlands
SBV Vitesse players
SC Heerenveen players
Shimizu S-Pulse players
FC Machida Zelvia players
Yokohama FC players